Kampong Kapor Constituency was a constituency in Singapore. It used to exist from 1955 to 1976.

Member of Parliament

Elections

Elections in 1950s

Elections in 1960s

Historical maps

References 

Singaporean electoral divisions